Artak Malumyan is an Armenian amateur boxer best known for coming in third at the 2005 World Amateur Boxing Championships in the Light Heavyweight category.

References

Living people
Light-heavyweight boxers
Armenian male boxers
AIBA World Boxing Championships medalists
Year of birth missing (living people)